Långsele AIF is a sports club in Långsele, Sweden, established on 11 June 1920 as IF Renen before changing name on 25 October the same year.

The women's soccer team, which began to play league games in 1975, played three seasons in the Swedish top division between 1978–1982.

References

External links
Långsele AIF 

Football clubs in Västernorrland County
Sports clubs established in 1920
Sport in Västernorrland County
Defunct bandy clubs in Sweden
Athletics clubs in Sweden
Gymnastics clubs
Basketball teams in Sweden
Defunct ice hockey teams in Sweden
Ski clubs in Sweden
1920 establishments in Sweden
Association football clubs established in 1920
Bandy clubs established in 1920